The 1799 English cricket season was the 28th in which matches have been awarded retrospective first-class cricket status and the 13th after the foundation of the Marylebone Cricket Club. The season saw four top-class matches played in the country.

A cricket club was formed at Seringapatam in south India after the successful British siege.

Matches 
Just four top-class matches were played during the season, three of them featuring sides styled at least in part as Surrey XIs.

First mentions
Players who made their first-class cricket debuts in 1799 included:
 Hockley
 Stephen Lushington
 Woodroffe

References

Further reading
 
 
 
 

1799 in English cricket
English cricket seasons in the 18th century